The 1936 Louisville Cardinals football team was an American football team that represented the University of Louisville as a member of the Southern Intercollegiate Athletic Association (SIAA) during the 1936 college football season. In their first season under head coach Laurie Apitz, the Cardinals compiled a 4–4 record.

Schedule

References

Louisville
Louisville Cardinals football seasons
Louisville Cardinals football